Dangerous Night is a Hindi Horror film of Bollywood directed and produced by Muneer Khan. This film was released on 19 December 2003 under the banner of S.P. Films Creations.

Plot

Cast
 Shakti Kapoor as Servant
 Raza Murad as Thakur
 Mac Mohan
 Rajesh Vivek
 Sapna (actress)
 Amit Pachori
 Satnam Kaur
 Anil Nagrath
 Ramesh Goyel
 Vinod Tripathi
 Muneer Khan
 Ali Khan

Soundtrack
The music composer of the movie was Bappi Lahiri and Soumitra Lahiri, and the singers were Asha Bhosle, Alka Yagnik, Amit Kumar and Bappi Lahiri.

References

External links 
 

2003 films
2000s Hindi-language films
Films scored by Bappi Lahiri
Indian horror films
2003 horror films
Hindi-language horror films